Maman may refer to:

Places
Maman, East Azerbaijan (ممان - Mamān), Iran
Maman, Kurdistan (مامن - Māman), Iran

People
 Maman (footballer) (1980-), from Indonesia, in national team in 2001

Arts, entertainment, and media

Films
Maman (1990 film) (fr), film by Romain Goupil
Maman! (2010 film) (fr), film by Hélène de Fougerolles
Maman (2012 film) film by Alexandra Leclère
Mommy Is at the Hairdresser's (Maman est chez le coiffeur), a 2008 drama film directed by Léa Pool

Music
"Maman", song by Canadian singer :fr:Aimé Major (1924-1996) 1960
"Maman", song by French singer Barbara (singer) (1930-1997)
"Maman", song by French singer Dalida (1933-1987)
"Maman", song by French Guianan singer Henri Salvador 1959
"Maman", song by French singer Christophe (singer) 1967
"Maman", song by George Bellamy (musician) 1972
"Maman", song by English actor Edward Woodward	1973
"Maman", 1983 single by Murray Head, and from 1988 album Shade
"Maman", song by Maddy Prior from 2003 album Lionhearts
"Maman a tort", 1984 song by French artist Mylène Farmer

Other arts, entertainment, and media
Maman (sculpture), giant spider by Louise Bourgeois
Maman, novel by José Germain Drouilly

Other
 Bonne Maman, French food company
 Maman Brigitte, a spirit or lwa in Haitian Vodou
 in French, maman translates to mom.